Batiz from the kindred Negol (died 1224) was a Hungarian noble, who served as Judge royal from 1222 until his death, during the reign of Andrew II of Hungary.

He was born into the gens (clan) Negol (or Nygol), which originated from Baranya County, he had a younger brother, Nicholas. Batiz (or Botez) married Ahalyz (also Elizabeth) of French origin, who was a maid of honor for Queen Yolanda, the second spouse of King Andrew II. Batiz and Ahalyz had no children, and following Batiz's death in 1224, the French noblewoman married to Solomon Atyusz (his predecessor as Judge royal), and later Bertrand Bajóti, when she was widowed for a second time.

Batiz was first mentioned as ispán of Moson County between 1219 and 1221. Following this, he functioned as head of Szolnok County in 1221. He was appointed Judge royal in the very end of 1222, replacing Solomon Atyusz. Beside that he also served as ispán of Békés County from 1222 to 1224. In 1223, Batiz was rebuked by Pope Honorius III, because he had formerly financially damaged Gottfried, the Provost of Arad. He died in 1224.

References

Sources

 
 
 

1224 deaths
13th-century Hungarian people
Judges royal